Mark Jason Thomas (born April 26, 1976) is a former American football tight end , played for the New York Giants of the National Football League (NFL). He played college football at North Carolina State University.

Thomas cohosted a morning sports talk show, Mark and Mike, (with Mike Maniscalco) on a radio station based in Raleigh, North Carolina.

References 

1976 births
Living people
People from Kinston, North Carolina
Players of American football from North Carolina
American football tight ends
NC State Wolfpack football players
New York Giants players
Memphis Maniax players